Harry Cobb Rooney (March 23, 1900 – May 1973) was a professional American football player who played running back for seven seasons for the Duluth Kelleys/Eskimos, New York Yankees, and Chicago Cardinals.

References

1900 births
1973 deaths
American football running backs
New York Yankees (NFL) players
Duluth Kelleys players
Duluth Eskimos players
Chicago Cardinals players